Mycena lux-coeli—meaning "heavenly light mushrooms"—is a bioluminescent species of fungus in the family Mycenaceae. It was first discovered in 1954 on Hachijō-jima where it is widely found, and decades later was found on multiple islands in Japan.

Hachijō-jima island is also home to the bioluminescent mushroom species, Mycena chlorophos. The local name for these mushrooms is hato-no-hi, literally "pigeon fire".

References

lux-coeli
Fungi described in 1954
Fungi of Japan